George Whitehall (29 March 1843 – 24 August 1882) was a Barbadian cricketer. He played in three first-class matches for the Barbados cricket team from 1864 to 1872.

See also
 List of Barbadian representative cricketers

References

External links
 

1843 births
1882 deaths
Barbadian cricketers
Barbados cricketers
People from Christ Church, Barbados